Angela Birch (born 24 August 1974) is a Fijian former swimmer. She competed in five events at the 1988 Summer Olympics.

References

External links

1974 births
Living people
Fijian female swimmers
Olympic swimmers of Fiji
Swimmers at the 1988 Summer Olympics
Place of birth missing (living people)
20th-century Fijian women
21st-century Fijian women